Xu Zangjun (born February 6, 1992) is a Chinese sailor. He and Wang Wei placed 18th in the men's 470 event at the 2016 Summer Olympics.

References

1992 births
Living people
Chinese male sailors (sport)
Olympic sailors of China
Sailors at the 2016 Summer Olympics – 470
Asian Games medalists in sailing
Sailors at the 2018 Asian Games
Medalists at the 2018 Asian Games
Asian Games silver medalists for China
Sailors at the 2020 Summer Olympics – 470
21st-century Chinese people